Fort McDermitt is a census-designated place (CDP) in Humboldt County, Nevada, United States. The population was 341 at the 2010 census. It overlaps the Fort McDermitt Indian Reservation and lies just south of the McDermitt CDP.

Geography
U.S. Route 95 runs through the CDP, leading north to Oregon and western Idaho and south  to Winnemucca, Nevada.

Demographics

See also
 Fort McDermitt Paiute and Shoshone Tribe

References

Census-designated places in Humboldt County, Nevada
Census-designated places in Nevada